Milutin Milanković (sometimes anglicised as Milankovitch;  ; 28 May 1879 – 12 December 1958) was a Serbian mathematician, astronomer, climatologist, geophysicist, civil engineer and popularizer of science.

Milanković gave two fundamental contributions to global science. The first contribution is the "Canon of the Earth's Insolation", which characterizes the climates of all the planets of the Solar System. The second contribution is the explanation of Earth's long-term climate changes caused by changes in the position of the Earth in comparison to the Sun, now known as Milankovitch cycles. This partly explained the ice ages occurring in the geological past of the Earth, as well as the climate changes on the Earth which can be expected in the future.

He founded planetary climatology by calculating temperatures of the upper layers of the Earth's atmosphere as well as the temperature conditions on planets of the inner Solar System, Mercury, Venus, Mars, and the Moon, as well as the depth of the atmosphere of the outer planets. He demonstrated the interrelatedness of celestial mechanics and the Earth sciences and enabled a consistent transition from celestial mechanics to the Earth sciences and transformation of descriptive sciences into exact ones.

A distinguished professor of applied mathematics and celestial mechanics at the University of Belgrade, Milanković was a director of the Belgrade Observatory, member and co-founder of the Commission 7 for celestial mechanics of the International Astronomical Union and vice-president of Serbian Academy of Sciences and Arts. Beginning his career as a construction engineer, he retained an interest in construction throughout his life, and worked as a structural engineer and supervisor on a series of reinforced concrete constructions throughout Yugoslavia. He registered multiple patents related to this area.

Life

Early life

Milutin Milanković was born in the village of Dalj, a settlement on the banks of the Danube in what was then part of Austro-Hungarian Empire. Milutin and his twin sister were the oldest of seven children raised in a Serb family. Their father was a merchant, landlord, and a local politician who died when Milutin was eight. As a result, Milutin and his siblings were raised by his mother, grandmother, and an uncle. His three brothers died of tuberculosis as children. As his health was fickle, Milutin received his elementary education at home (in "the classroom without walls"), learning from his father Milan, private teachers, and from numerous relatives and friends of the family, some of whom were renowned philosophers, inventors, and poets. He attended secondary school in nearby Osijek, completing it in 1896.

In October 1896, at the age of seventeen, he moved to Vienna to study Civil Engineering at the TU Wien and graduated in 1902 with the best marks. In his memoirs, Milanković wrote about his lectures on engineering: "Professor Czuber was teaching us mathematics. His every sentence was the masterpiece of strict logic, without any extra word, without any error." After graduating and spending his obligatory year in military service, Milanković borrowed money from an uncle to pay for additional schooling at TU Wien in engineering. He researched concrete and wrote a theoretical evaluation of it as a building material. At age twenty-five, his PhD thesis was entitled Contribution to the Theory of Pressure Curves (Beitrag zur Theorie der Druckkurven) and its implementation allowed assessment of pressure curves' shape and properties when continuous pressure is applied, which is very useful in bridge, cupola and abutment construction. His thesis was successfully defended on 12 December 1904; examination committee members were Johan Brick, Josef Finger, Emanuel Czuber and Ludwig von Tetmajer. He then worked for an engineering firm in Vienna, using his knowledge to design structures.

Middle years

Construction engineering
At the beginning of 1905, Milanković took up practical work and joined the firm of Adolf Baron Pittel Betonbau-Unternehmung in Vienna. He built dams, bridges, viaducts, aqueducts, and other structures in reinforced concrete throughout Austria-Hungary. The result was particularly evident in the extraordinary design of a reinforced-concrete aqueduct for a hydroelectric power plant in Sebeș, Transylvania, which Milanković designed at the beginning of his career.

He patented a new type of reinforced concrete ribbed ceiling and published the first paper on armored concrete named "Contribution to the theory of reinforced armored pillars". He published the second paper on the same subject based on new results in 1906. In 1908, he published a paper titled "On membranes of same opposition" in which he proves that the ideal shape for a water reservoir of equally thick walls is that of a drop of water. His six patents were officially recognized and his reputation in the profession was enormous, bringing abundant financial wealth.

Milanković continued to practice civil engineering in Vienna until 1 October 1909 when he was offered the chair of applied mathematics (rational, celestial mechanics, and theoretical physics) at the University of Belgrade. Though he continued to pursue his investigations of various problems pertaining to the application of reinforced concrete, he decided to concentrate on fundamental research.

Milanković continued in design and construction work when he moved to Serbia. During 1912, he designed the reinforced bridges in the Timok valley on the railway line Niš-Knjaževac.

Planet's insolation
While studying the works of the contemporaneous climatologist Julius von Hann, Milanković noticed a significant issue, which became one of the major objects of his scientific research: a mystery ice age. The idea of possible astronomically-related climate changes was first considered by astronomers (John Herschel, 1792–1871) and then postulated by geologists (Louis Agassiz, 1807–1873). In parallel, there were also several attempts to explain the climate change by the influence of astronomical forces (the most comprehensive of them was the theory put forward by James Croll in the 1860s). Milanković studied the works of Joseph Adhemar whose pioneering theory on the astronomical origins of ice ages were formally rejected by his contemporaries and James Croll whose work was effectively forgotten about even after acceptance by contemporaries such as Charles Darwin. Despite having valuable data on the distribution of ice ages on Alps, climatologists and geologists could not discover the basic causes – that is, the different insolations of the Earth during past ages remained beyond the scope of these sciences. But Milanković decided to follow their path and attempt correctly to calculate the magnitude of such influences. Milanković sought the solution of these complex problems in the field of spherical geometry, celestial mechanics, and theoretical physics.

He began working on it in 1912, after he had realized that "most of meteorology is nothing but a collection of innumerable empirical findings, mainly numerical data, with traces of physics used to explain some of them... Mathematics was even less applied, nothing more than elementary calculus... Advanced mathematics had no role in that science..." His first work described the present climate on Earth and how the Sun's rays determine the temperature on Earth's surface after passing through the atmosphere. He published the first paper on the subject entitled "Contribution to the mathematical theory of climate"  in Belgrade on 5 April 1912. His next paper was entitled "Distribution of the sun radiation on the earth's surface" and was published on 5 June 1913. He correctly calculates the intensity of insolation and developed a mathematical theory describing Earth's climate zones. His aim was an integral, mathematically accurate theory which connects thermal regimes of the planets to their movement around the Sun. He wrote: "...such a theory would enable us to go beyond the range of direct observations, not only in space, but also in time... It would allow reconstruction of the Earth's climate, and also its predictions, as well as give us the first reliable data about the climate conditions on other planets." Then he tried to find a mathematical model of a cosmic mechanism to describe the Earth's climatic and geological history. He published a paper on the subject entitled "About the issue of the astronomical theory of ice ages" in 1914. But the cosmic mechanism was not an easy problem, and Milanković took three decades to develop an astronomical theory.

At the same time, the July Crisis between the Austro-Hungarian empire and Serbia broke out, which led to World War I. On 14 June 1914, Milanković married Kristina Topuzović and went on his honeymoon to his native village of Dalj in Austro-Hungary, where he heard about the beginning of the War. He was arrested as a citizen of Serbia and was interned by the Austro-Hungarian army in Neusiedl am See. He described his first day in prison, where he waited to be taken to the Esseg fortress as a prisoner of war, in the following words:

The heavy iron door closed behind me .... I sat on my bed, looked around the room and started to take in my new social circumstances .... In my hand luggage which I brought with me were my already printed or only started works on my cosmic problem; there was even some blank paper. I looked over my works, took my faithful ink pen and started to write and calculate .... When after midnight I looked around in the room, I needed some time to realize where I was. The small room seemed to me like an accommodation for one night during my voyage in the Universe.

His wife went to Vienna to talk to Emanuel Czuber, who was his mentor and a good friend. Through his social connections, Professor Czuber arranged Milanković's release from prison and permission to spend his captivity in Budapest with the right to work.

Immediately after arriving in Budapest, Milanković met the Director of the Library of the Hungarian Academy of Science, Koloman von Szilly who, as a mathematician, eagerly accepted Milanković and enabled him to work undisturbed in the Academy's library and the Central Meteorological Institute. Milanković spent four years in Budapest, almost the entire war. He used mathematical methods to study the current climate of inner planets of the solar system. In 1916 he published a paper entitled "Investigation of the climate of the planet Mars". Also, he concluded that: "This large temperature difference between the ground and lower layers of the atmosphere is not unexpected. Great transparency for solar radiation makes that is the climate of Mars very similar to altitudes climate of our Earth." In any case, Milanković theoretically proved that Mars has an extremely harsh climate. In addition to considering Mars, he dealt with the climatic conditions prevailing on Venus and Mercury. His calculations of the temperature conditions on the neighboring Moon are particularly significant. Milanković knew that one day on the Moon lasts 15 Earth days, and this is the amount and length of night. Milanković calculated that the surface temperature on the day side of the moon reaches +100.5 °C. Also, he calculated that the temperature during the early morning on the Moon, or before the rise of the Sun over horizon, was −58 °C. Today it is known that the surface temperature on the day side of the Moon reaches +108 °C and that it falls at night to −153 °C.

After World War I, Milanković returned to Belgrade with his family on 19 March 1919. He continued his professorial career, becoming a full professor at the University of Belgrade. From 1912 to 1917, he wrote and published seven papers on mathematical theories of climate both on the Earth and on the other planets. He formulated a precise, numerical climatological model with the capacity for reconstruction of the past and prediction of the future, and established the astronomical theory of climate as a generalized mathematical theory of insolation. When these most important problems of the theory were solved, and a firm foundation for further work built, Milanković finished a book which was published in 1920, by the Gauthier-Villars in Paris under the title "Théorie mathématique des phénomènes thermiques produits par la radiation solaire" (Mathematical Theory of Heat Phenomena Produced by Solar Radiation). Immediately after the publication of this book in 1920, meteorologists recognized it as a significant contribution to the study of contemporary climate. This work was the topic of letter correspondence from 1924 to 1952 between M. Milanković and V. Mišković.
 
The works of Vilhelm Bjerknes in 1904, and Lewis Fry Richardson in 1922 are the foundation of modern numerical weather prediction.

Orbital variations and ice age cycles
Milanković's works on astronomical explanations of ice ages, especially his curve of insolation for the past 130,000 years, received support from the climatologist Wladimir Köppen and from the geophysicist Alfred Wegener. Köppen noted the usefulness of Milanković's theory for paleoclimatological researchers. Milanković received a letter on 22 September 1922 from Köppen, who asked him to expand his studies from 130,000 years to 600,000 years. They agreed that summer insolation is a crucial factor for climate. After developing the mathematical machinery enabling him to calculate the insolation in any given geographical latitude and for any annual season, Milanković was ready to start the realization of the mathematical description of climate of the Earth in the past. Milanković spent 100 days doing the calculations and prepared a graph of solar radiation changes at geographical latitudes of 55°, 60° and 65° north for the past 650,000 years. Milanković believed that these were the latitudes on Earth most sensitive to the change of thermal balance. From that time there is an anecdote, when Milanković's good friend and professor of geography, Jovan Cvijić, asked him: Why do you calculate temperature conditions at the top of the atmosphere, what is the purpose?!

These curves showed the variations in insolation which correlated with the series of ice ages. Köppen felt that Milanković's theoretical approach to solar energy was a logical approach to the problem. His solar curve was introduced in a work entitled "Climates of the geological past", published by Wladimir Köppen and his son-in-law Alfred Wegener in 1924.

Milanković put the Sun at the center of his theory, as the only source of heat and light in the Solar System. He considered three cyclical movements of the Earth: eccentricity (100,000-year cycle – Johannes Kepler, 1609), axial tilt (41,000-year cycle – from 22.1° to 24.5°), and precession (23,000-year cycle – Hipparchus, 130 BC). Each cycle works on a different time-scale and each affects the amount of solar energy received by the planets. Such changes in the geometry of an orbit lead to the changes in the insolation – the quantity of heat received by any spot at the surface of a planet. These orbital variations, which are influenced by gravity of the Moon, Sun, Jupiter, and Saturn, form the basis of the Milankovitch cycle. His original contribution to celestial mechanics is called Milanković's system of vector elements of planetary orbits. He reduced six Lagrangean-Laplacian elliptical elements to two vectors determining the mechanics of planetary movements. The first specifies the planet's orbital plane, the sense of revolution of the planet, and the orbital ellipse parameter; the second specifies the axis of the orbit in its plane and the orbital eccentricity. By applying those vectors he significantly simplified the calculation and directly obtained all the formulas of the classical theory of secular perturbations. Milanković, in a simple but original manner, first deduced Newton's law of gravitation from Kepler's laws. Then Milanković treated the two-body and the many-body problems of celestial mechanics. He accepted but corrected the Le Verrier and Stockwell computation by using newer and more accurate values for the masses of the planets in the solar system.

The Serbian Academy of Sciences and Arts elected Milanković as a corresponding member in 1920; he became a full member in 1924. The Meteorological service of the Kingdom of Yugoslavia became a member of International Meteorological Organization – IMO (founded in Brussels in 1853 and in Vienna in 1873) as a predecessor of present World Meteorological Organization, WMO. Milanković served as a representative of the Kingdom of Yugoslavia there for many years.

Köppen proposed to Milanković on 14 December 1926 to extend his calculations to a million years and to send his results to Barthel Eberl, a geologist studying the Danube basin, as Eberl's research had unearthed some pre-Ice Ages before over 650,000 years. Eberl published all this in Augsburg in 1930 together with Milanković's curves.

Between 1925 and 1928 Milanković wrote the popular-science book Through Distant Worlds and Times in the form of letters to an anonymous woman. The work discusses the history of astronomy, climatology and science via a series of imaginary visits to various points in space and time by the author and his unnamed companion, encompassing the formation of the Earth, past civilizations, famous ancient and renaissance thinkers and their achievements, and the work of his contemporaries, Köppen and Wegener. In the "letters", Milanković expanded on some of his own theories on astronomy and climatology, and described the complicated problems of celestial mechanics in a simplified manner.
Subsequently, Milanković wrote the introductory portion of Mathematical science of climate and astronomical theory of the variations of the climate (Mathematische Klimalehre und Astronomische Theorie der Klimaschwankungen), published by Köppen (Handbook of Climatology; Handbuch der Klimalogie Band 1) in 1930 in German and translated into Russian in 1939. In 1934 Milanković published the book Celestial Mechanics. This textbook used vector calculus systematically to solve problems of celestial mechanics.

In the period from 1935 to 1938 Milanković calculated that ice cover depended on changes in insolation. He succeeded in defining the mathematical relationship between summer insolation and the altitude of the snow line. In this way he defined the increase of snow which would occur as a consequence of any given change in summer insolation. He published his results in the study "New Results of the Astronomic Theory of Climate Changes" in 1938. Geologists received a graph for presenting bordering altitudes of ice covers any period of time during the last 600,000 years. André Berger and Jacques Laskar later developed this theory further.

Polar wandering

Conversations with Wegener, the author of continental drift theory, got Milanković interested in the interior of the Earth and the movement of the poles, so he told his friend that he would investigate polar wandering. In November 1929, Milanković received an invitation from Professor Beno Gutenberg of Darmstadt to collaborate on a ten volume handbook on geophysics and to publish his views on the problem of the secular variations of the Earth's rotational poles. Wegener presented extensive empirical evidence in his scientific work on the 'great events' during the Earth's past. However, one of the main findings that especially preoccupied Wegener and then Milankovitch was the discovery of big coal reserves on the Svalbard Islands, in the Arctic Ocean, which could not form at the present latitude of these islands. In the meantime, Wegener died (from hypothermia or heart failure) in November 1930 during his fourth expedition to Greenland. Milanković became convinced that the continents 'float' on a somewhat fluid subsurface and that the positions of the continents with respect to the axis of rotation affect the centrifugal force of the rotation and can throw the axis off balance and force it to move. Wegener's tragedy additionally motivated Milankovich to persevere in solving the problem of polar wandering.

In the period from 1930 to 1933, Milankovitch worked on the problem of numerical secular rotation pole movements. The Earth as a whole he considered as a fluid body, which in the case of short-duration forces behaves as a solid body, but under an influence behaves as an elastic body. Using vector analysis he made a mathematical model of the Earth to create a theory of secular motion of the terrestrial poles. He derived the equation of secular trajectory of a terrestrial pole and also the equation of pole motion along this trajectory. The equations further led to a determination of the 25 most characteristic points with pole trajectories for both hemispheres. This mathematical calculation led Milanković to 16 important points from the past that form parts of early explorations; 8 points triggered future explorations. He drew a map of the path of the poles over the past 300 million years and stated that changes happen in the interval of 5 million years (minimum) to 30 million years (maximum). He found that the secular pole trajectory depends only on the configuration of the terrestrial outer shell and the instantaneous pole position on it, more precisely on geometry of the Earth mass. On this basis he could calculate the secular pole trajectory. Also, based on Milanković's model, the continental blocks sink into their underlying "fluidal" base, and slide around, 'aiming to achieve' isostatic equilibrium. In his conclusion about this problem, he wrote: For an extraterrestrial observer, the displacement of the pole takes place in such a way that the ... Earth's axis maintains its orientation in space, but the Earth's crust is displaced on its substratum. Milankovitch published his paper on the subject entitled "Numerical trajectory of secular changes of pole’s rotation" in Belgrade in 1932.

At the same time, Milanković wrote four sections of Beno Gutenberg's "Handbook of Geophysics" (Handbuch der Geophysik) – "The Earth's Position and Movement in Space", "Rotational Movement of the Earth", "Secular shift of the Poles", and "Astronomic Means for Climate Study during the Earth's history" – published by Wegener's father-in-law Köppen in 1933. The lecture on the apparent shift of poles was held at a congress of Balkan mathematicians in Athens in 1934. That same year, Milanković published an article dedicated to the work Alfred Wegener under titled "Moving of the Earth's Poles – A Memory to Alfred Wegener".

Milankovitch's work on the trajectory of poles was well accepted only by Köppen's associates, because most of the scientific community was skeptical about Wegener and Milankovic's new theories. Later, in the 1950s and 1960s, development of the new scientific discipline in geophysics known as palaeomagnetism led to the key evidence on the basis of studying the records of Earth's magnetic field in rocks over geological time. Paleomagnetic evidence, both reversals and polar wandering data, led the revival of the theories of continental drift and its transformation into plate tectonics in the 1960s and 1970s. Unlike Milankovic's linear trajectory of poles, palaeomagnetism reconstructed the path of the poles over geological history to show the nonlinear trajectory.

Later life
To collect his scientific work on the theory of solar radiation that was scattered in many books and papers, Milanković began his life's work in 1939. This tome was entitled "Canon of Insolation of the Earth and Its Application to the Problem of the Ice Ages", which covered his nearly three decades of research, including a large number of formulas, calculations and schemes, but also summarized universal laws through which it was possible to explain cyclical climate change and the attendant 11 ice ages – his namesake Milankovitch cycles.

Milanković spent two years arranging and writing the "Canon". The manuscript was submitted to print on 2 April 1941 – four days before the attack of Nazi Germany and its allies on the Kingdom of Yugoslavia. In the bombing of Belgrade on 6 April 1941, the printing house where his work was being printed was destroyed; however, almost all of the printed sheet paper remained undamaged in the printing warehouse. After the successful occupation of Serbia on 15 May 1941, two German officers and geology students came to Milanković in his house and brought greetings from Professor  of Freiburg. Milanković gave them the only complete printed copy of the "Canon" to send to Soergel, to make certain that his work would be preserved. Milanković did not take part in the work of the university during the occupation, and after the war he was reinstated as professor.

The "Canon" was issued in 1941 by the Royal Serbian Academy, 626 pages in quarto, and was printed in German as "Kanon der Erdbestrahlung und seine Anwendung auf das Eiszeitenproblem". The titles of the six parts of the book are:
 "The planets' motion around the Sun and their mutual perturbations"
 "The rotation of the Earth"
 "Secular wanderings of the rotational poles of the Earth"
 "The Earth's insolation and its secular changes"
 "The connection between insolation and the temperature of the Earth and its atmosphere. The mathematical climate of the Earth"
 "The ice age, its mechanism, structure and chronology".
During the German occupation of Serbia from 1941 to 1944, Milanković withdrew from public life and decided to write a "history of his life and work" going beyond scientific matters, including his personal life and the love of his father who died in his youth. His autobiography would be published after the war, entitled "Recollection, Experiences and Vision" in Belgrade in 1952.

History of science
After the war, Milanković was vice president of the Serbian Academy of Sciences (1948–1958) and became a member of the Commission 7 for celestial mechanics in the International Astronomical Union in 1948. In the same year, he became a member of the Italian Institute of Paleontology. In November 1954, fifty years after receiving his original diploma, he received the Golden Doctor's diploma from the Technical University of Vienna. In 1955, he was also elected to the German Academy of Naturalists "Leopoldina" in Halle, Saxony-Anhalt.

At the same time, Milanković began publishing numerous books on the history of science, including Isaac Newton and Newton's Principia (1946), The founders of the natural science Pythagoras – Democritus – Aristotle – Archimedes (1947), History of astronomy – from its beginnings up to 1727 (1948), Through empire of science – images from the lives of great scientists (1950), Twenty-two centuries of Chemistry (1953), and Techniques in the ancient times (1955).

Milutin suffered a stroke and died in Belgrade in 1958. He is buried in his family cemetery in Dalj.

Legacy

After Milanković's death, most of the scientific community came to dispute his "astronomical theory" and no longer recognized the results of his research. But ten years after his death and fifty years from the first publication, Milanković's theory was again taken under consideration. His book was translated into English under the title "Canon of Insolation of the Ice-Age Problem" in 1969 by the Israel Program for Scientific Translations, and was published by the U.S. Department of Commerce and the National Science Foundation in Washington, D.C.

In the beginning, recognition came slowly, but later, the theory was proven to be accurate. Project CLIMAP (Climate: Long Range Investigation, Mapping and Production) finally resolved the dispute and proved the theory of Milankovitch cycles.
In 1972, scientists compiled a time scale of climatic events in the past 700,000 years from deep-sea cores. They performed the analysis of the cores and four years later, came to the conclusion that in the past 500,000 years, climate has changed depending on the inclination of the Earth's axis of rotation and its precession. In 1988, a new major project COHMAP (Cooperative Holocene Mapping
Project) reconstructed the patterns of global climate change over the last 18,000 years, again demonstrating the key role of astronomical factors. In 1989, the project SPECMAP (Spectral Mapping Project), showed that the climate changes are responses to changes in solar radiation of each of the three astronomical cycles.

In 1999, it was shown that variations in the isotopic composition of oxygen in the sediments at the bottom of the ocean follow Milankovitch theory. There are other recent studies that indicate the validity of the original Milankovitch theory. Although orbital forcing of Earth's climate is well accepted, the details of how orbitally-induced changes in insolation affect climate are debated.

On light
Milanković authored two papers on relativity. He wrote his first paper "On the theory of Michelson's experiment" in 1912. He was doing research in this theory from 1924. His papers on this matter were on special relativity and both are on the Michelson experiment (now known as the Michelson–Morley experiment) which produced strong evidence against aether theory. In the light of the Michelson experiment he discussed on the validity of the second postulate of special theory of relativity, that the speed of light is the same in every reference frame.

Revised Julian calendar

Milanković proposed a revised Julian calendar in 1923. It made centennial years leap years if division by 900 left a remainder of 200 or 600, unlike the Gregorian rule which required that division by 400 left no remainder. In May 1923 a congress of some Eastern Orthodox churches adopted the calendar; however, only the removal of 1–13 October 1923 and the revised leap year algorithm were adopted by a number of Eastern Orthodox churches. The dates of Easter and related holy days are still computed using the Julian calendar. At the time of Milanković's proposal, it was suspected the period of rotation of Earth might not be constant, but it was not until the development of quartz and atomic clocks beginning in the 1930s that this could be proven and quantified. The variation in the period of rotation of Earth is the chief cause of long-term inaccuracy in both the Gregorian and Revised Julian calendars.

Awards and honors

In honour of his achievements in astronomy, an impact crater on the far side of the Moon was given the name Milankovic at the 14th IAU General Assembly in 1970. His name is also given to a crater on Mars at the 15th IAU General Assembly in 1973. Since 1993 the Milutin Milankovic Medal has been awarded by the European Geophysical Society (called the EGU since 2003) for contributions in the
area of long-term climate and modeling. A main belt asteroid discovered in 1936 has also been dubbed 1605 Milankovitch. At NASA, in their edition of "On the Shoulders of Giants", Milanković has been ranked among the top fifteen minds of all time in the field of earth sciences. He was awarded Order of Saint Sava and Order of the Yugoslav Crown.

In popular culture 
Milutin Milanković – A Traveler Through Distant Worlds and Times, a 2007 documentary film based on the biography of Milutin Milankovitch, directed by Dušan Vuleković.

Selected works
 Théorie mathématique des phénomènes thermiques produits par la radiation solaire, XVI, 338 S. – Paris: Gauthier-Villars, 1920
 Reforma julijanskog kalendara. Srpska Kr. Akad. Pos. Izda’na 47: 52 S., Beograd: Sv. Sava, 1923
 Mathematische Klimalehre und astronomische Theorie der Klimaschwankungen. In: Köppen, W.; Geiger R. (Hrsg.): Handbuch der Klimatologie, Bd. 1: Allgemeine Klimalehre, Berlin: Borntraeger, 1930
 Mathematische Klimalehre. In: Gutenberg, B. (Hrsg.) Handbuch der Geophysik, Berlin: Borntraeger, 1933
 Durch ferne Welten und Zeiten, Briefe eines Weltallbummlers. 389 S. – Leipzig: Koehler & Amelang, 1936
 Kanon der Erdbestrahlung und seine Anwendung auf das Eiszeitenproblem. Académie royale serbe. Éditions speciales; 132 [vielm. 133]: XX, 633, Belgrad, 1941
 Canon of insolation and the ice-age problem. English translation by the Israel Program for Scientific Translations, published for the U.S. Department of Commerce and National Science Foundation, Washington, D.C.: 633 S., 1969
 Canon of Insolation and the Ice-Age Problem. Pantic, N. (Hrsg.), Beograd: Zavod Nastavna Sredstva, 634 S., 1998

See also
History of climate change science

References

External links

Ice Age – Milankovitch Cycles – National Geographic Channel Three variables known as the Milankovitch Cycles affect how and when Earth enters an ice age or global warming.
 Milanković’s Analysis of Newton’s Law of Universal Gravitation
 Milankovitch theory hits and misses
 Milankovitch cycles
 Life and Scientific Work of Milutin Milanković
 Solar Radiation and Milanković
 Precession and the Milanković Theory
 NASA Earth Observatory article in the "on the shoulders of giants" series

1879 births
1958 deaths
People from Dalj
People from the Kingdom of Serbia
Members of the Serbian Orthodox Church
Members of the Serbian Academy of Sciences and Arts
Recipients of the Order of St. Sava
Recipients of the Order of the Yugoslav Crown
Serbian scientists
Serbian astronomers
Serbian climatologists
Serbian geophysicists
Serbian mathematicians
Serbian civil engineers
Serbian writers
Serbian non-fiction writers
Serbian science fiction writers
TU Wien alumni
Academic staff of the University of Belgrade
Serbian twins
20th-century Serbian people
Austro-Hungarian Serbs
Habsburg Serbs